is a Japanese footballer currently playing as a forward for ReinMeer Aomori, on loan from Montedio Yamagata.

Career statistics

Club
.

Notes

References

External links
Profile at ReinMeer Aomori

2002 births
Living people
Association football people from Fukushima Prefecture
Japanese footballers
Association football forwards
J2 League players
J3 League players
Japan Football League players
Fukushima United FC players
Montedio Yamagata players
Kamatamare Sanuki players
ReinMeer Aomori players